The 2018 Open de Limoges was a professional tennis tournament, played on indoor hard courts. It was the 12th edition of the tournament and part of the 2018 WTA 125K series, offering a total of $125,000 in prize money. It took place in Limoges, France, from 5 to 11 November 2018.

Singles main draw entrants

Seeds 

 1 Rankings as of 29 October 2018.

Other entrants 
The following players received wildcards into the singles main draw:
  Timea Bacsinszky
  Mihaela Buzărnescu
  Alizé Cornet 
  Chloé Paquet
  Pauline Parmentier 
  Katarina Zavatska
 
The following players received entry using a protected ranking into the singles main draw:
  Olga Govortsova
  Rebecca Šramková

The following players received entry from the qualifying draw:
  Audrey Albié
  Gréta Arn
  Marina Melnikova
  Renata Voráčová

The following players received entry into the main draw as a lucky loser:
  Jana Čepelová
  Sílvia Soler Espinosa

Withdrawals
Before the tournament;
  Katie Boulter → replaced by  Alexandra Dulgheru
  Olga Danilović → replaced by  Sílvia Soler Espinosa
  Vitalia Diatchenko → replaced by  Jamie Loeb
  Anhelina Kalinina → replaced by  Ekaterine Gorgodze
  Marta Kostyuk → replaced by  Paula Badosa Gibert
  Kristýna Plíšková → replaced by  Olga Govortsova
  Tereza Smitková → replaced by  Vera Zvonareva
  Conny Perrin → replaced by  Rebecca Šramková
  Carina Witthöft → replaced by  Viktoriya Tomova

Doubles entrants

Seeds 

 1 Rankings as of 29 October 2018.

Champions

Singles

  Ekaterina Alexandrova def.  Evgeniya Rodina, 6–2, 6–2

Doubles

  Veronika Kudermetova /  Galina Voskoboeva def.  Timea Bacsinszky /  Vera Zvonareva 7–5, 6–4

References

External links 
 Official website 

2018 WTA 125K series
2018 in French tennis
Open de Limoges